Elizabeth Anne "Betsey" Armstrong (born January 31, 1983) is an American water polo goalkeeper, who won gold medals with the United States women's national water polo team at the 2012 Summer Olympics, 2007 and 2011 Pan American Games, and 2007 and 2009 world championships. She is a leading goalkeeper in Olympic water polo history, with 102 saves. Armstrong attended Huron High School in Ann Arbor and was a three-year letterwinner on her water polo team.  She then went on to graduate from the University of Michigan in 2005, where she was the goalkeeper for the women's water polo team. Betsey graduated with a bachelor's degree in English language and Literature. She is currently the record holder at University of Michigan with 350 saves.

Armstrong made her debut for the national team in 2006. At the Beijing 2008 Summer Olympics, they lost 8–9 in the championship game to the Netherlands and took home the silver medal. She was the top goalkeeper at the 2008 Olympics, with 49 saves.

In June 2009, Armstrong was named to the USA water polo women's senior national team for the 2009 FINA World Championships. She was named the best female water polo player for 2010 by FINA Aquatics World Magazine.

Starting in 2012, Betsey was hired as the assistant coach of the University of Michigan Women's Water Polo Team. She works alongside head coach Matt Anderson in coaching the players.

In 2019, she was inducted into the USA Water Polo Hall of Fame.

International competitions
 2000 — Junior Pan American Games, Barquisimeto, Venezuela, 1st place
 2006 — FINA World League, Cosenza, Italy, 1st place
 2006 — FINA World Cup, Tianjin, China, 4th place
 2006 — Holiday Cup, Los Alamitos, United States, 1st place
 2007 — FINA World Championships, Melbourne, Australia, 1st place
 2007 — FINA World League, Montréal, Canada, 1st place
 2007 — Pan American Games, Rio de Janeiro, Brazil, 1st place
 2008 — Summer Olympic Games, Beijing, China, silver medal
 2011 — Pan American Games, gold medal
 2012 — Summer Olympic Games, London, gold medal

See also
 United States women's Olympic water polo team records and statistics
 List of Olympic champions in women's water polo
 List of Olympic medalists in water polo (women)
 List of women's Olympic water polo tournament goalkeepers
 List of world champions in women's water polo
 List of World Aquatics Championships medalists in water polo

References

External links
 

1983 births
Living people
Sportspeople from Ann Arbor, Michigan
American female water polo players
Water polo goalkeepers
Water polo players at the 2008 Summer Olympics
Water polo players at the 2012 Summer Olympics
Medalists at the 2008 Summer Olympics
Medalists at the 2012 Summer Olympics
Olympic gold medalists for the United States in water polo
Olympic silver medalists for the United States in water polo
World Aquatics Championships medalists in water polo
Water polo players at the 2007 Pan American Games
Water polo players at the 2011 Pan American Games
Pan American Games gold medalists for the United States
Pan American Games medalists in water polo
Michigan Wolverines women's water polo players
Michigan Wolverines women's water polo coaches
American water polo coaches
Medalists at the 2011 Pan American Games